Polde Milek (born 4 November 1948) is a Slovenian athlete. He competed in the men's high jump at the 1968 Summer Olympics, representing Yugoslavia.

References

1948 births
Living people
Athletes (track and field) at the 1968 Summer Olympics
Slovenian male high jumpers
Olympic athletes of Yugoslavia
Place of birth missing (living people)
Mediterranean Games bronze medalists for Yugoslavia
Mediterranean Games medalists in athletics
Athletes (track and field) at the 1967 Mediterranean Games